Moorabbin railway station is located on the Frankston line in Victoria, Australia. It serves the south-eastern Melbourne suburb of Moorabbin, and opened on 19 December 1881 as South Brighton. It was renamed Moorabbin on 1 May 1907.

History
Moorabbin station opened on 19 December 1881, when the railway line from Caulfield was extended to Mordialloc. Like the suburb itself, the station's name was derived from an Indigenous word meaning 'mother's milk'.

In 1957, the station was closed to goods traffic. In that same year, former sidings "A" and "B" were booked out of use.

In late 1958, the original station was relocated and placed in a deep cutting, coinciding with the construction of road overpasses for South Road and the Nepean Highway. At that time, provision was made for a third platform on the eastern side of the cutting. On 28 June 1987, the third platform finally came into use, when a third track from Caulfield was provided.

In the early hours of 6 December 1994, a fire destroyed all shops in the concourse. The concourse was rebuilt and new shops were constructed. In 1998, Moorabbin was upgraded to a Premium Station.

In 2014, the Station Street entrance and the bus interchange was re-built, as part of an upgrade program on the Frankston line.

Platforms and services
Moorabbin has one island platform with two faces, and one side platform. All platforms are accessible from the concourse via a ramp. The concourse contains a ticket office, toilets and shops. In the morning peak-hour, Frankston-bound services use Platform 3, with Flinders Street-bound services using Platforms 1 and 2. At other times, Frankston-bound trains use Platform 2. Two morning peak-hour services from Flinders Street terminate at Moorabbin and return to the city.

The station is served by Frankston line trains.

Platform 1:
  all stations services to Flinders Street, Werribee and Williamstown

Platform 2:
  all stations services to Flinders Street, Werribee and Williamstown; all stations services to Frankston

Platform 3:
  morning peak-hour all stations services to Frankston

Transport links

Ventura Bus Lines operates six routes via Moorabbin station, under contract to Public Transport Victoria:
 : to Chadstone Shopping Centre
 : Dandenong station – Brighton
 : Dandenong station – Brighton
 : North Brighton station – Westfield Southland
 : to Parkmore Shopping Centre
 : to Westfield Southland

Gallery

References

External links
 Melway map at street-directory.com.au

Premium Melbourne railway stations
Railway stations in Melbourne
Railway stations in Australia opened in 1881
Railway stations in the City of Kingston (Victoria)